James Emanuel "Big Jim" Ricca (October 8, 1927 – February 11, 2007) was a professional American football defensive tackle and guard for six seasons in the National Football League for the Washington Redskins, Philadelphia Eagles and Detroit Lions.

College career
For more than 50 years, Ricca was the last Georgetown University graduate to play in the NFL. The promotion of Alex Buzbee from the Washington Redskins practice squad to the active roster on December 19, 2007, ended the 51-year drought of Hoyas in the league. Ricca played for Georgetown from 1947 to 1949.

Professional career
Ricca—considered a behemoth for his era at 6 feet 4 inches, 270 lbs.—logged 47 games for the Redskins from 1951 to 1954, playing primarily at middle guard.

He was traded to Detroit prior to the 1955 season. Ricca played in only six games for the Lions before being traded to Philadelphia after a post-game tirade by Detroit head coach Buddy Parker aboard the team plane following a 38–21 loss at San Francisco.  He went on to play another season with Philadelphia.  He retired after the 1956 season after a 60-game career.

Personal life
After retiring from professional football, Ricca founded Jim Ricca and Associates, an advertising agency in Washington, D.C., in 1968.

Ricca's son John Ricca was a 1973 All-American defensive end and team captain at Duke University. He was the 12th-round pick of the New York Jets in the 1974 NFL Draft and played professionally in the Canadian Football League and World Football League. After coaching high school football for many years at St. John's College High School in Washington, D.C. and then St. John's at Prospect Hall in Frederick, Maryland, he became an assistant coach at Catholic University.

Three of Ricca's grandsons were college quarterbacks. Kevin and Keith Ricca both hold records for passing at Catholic University.  J.D. Ricca was twice named Virginia College Division Football Player of the Year at Hampden-Sydney College.  One of his other grandsons, Patrick Laverty, played offensive lineman at Catholic University as well.  His granddaughters are also accomplished athletes: Jamie Ricca was a 1,000-point scorer at St. John's College High School and played collegiate basketball at Marymount University.  Kristi Ricca was a three-sport athlete at St. John's College High School and now serves as an educator in the community. Jacqui Ricca played lacrosse from 2004 to 2007 at Mount St. Mary's University, where she was named the 2007 Defensive Player of the Year.

References

External links
 Jim Ricca obituary, The Washington Post, February 14, 2007
 "Riccas are brothers in arms", D3football.com
 "The Last Ricca: After 60 years on the field, a football family runs out of players", Dave McKenna, Washington City Paper, November 12, 2008

1927 births
2007 deaths
American football defensive linemen
American football offensive linemen
Detroit Lions players
Georgetown Hoyas football players
American people of Italian descent
People from Brooklyn
Philadelphia Eagles players
Washington Redskins players